Escott Frith Loney  (21 July 1903 – 19 June 1982)  was an English cricketer who played first-class cricket for  Derbyshire between 1925 and 1927.

Life
Born in Bristol, Loney made his debut for Derbyshire in the 1925 season in July against Leicestershire with modest scores, a few overs bowling and catching the opening batsman. He played six matches for the club in 1925 with a season's best bowling of 4 for 35 against Glamorgan . In the 1926 season he played six matches with his top score of 39 not out against Warwickshire and his best bowling of 4 for 27 against Somerset.  He played more matches in the 1927 season although he bowled less without taking a wicket. Loney was a left-hand batsman who played 37 innings in 25 first-class matches with an average of 17.03 and a top score of 39 not out. He was a right-arm medium-fast bowler and took 20 wickets for an average of 32.50 and a best performance of 4 for 27.

By 1933 Loney had moved to Toronto in Canada, and subsequently performed in various miscellaneous matches for Canadian sides.  He played a match for Toronto Cricket Club against Sir Julian Cahn's XI in 1933. In 1936 he toured England with R C Matthews' XI and he played three matches for different Canadian sides in 1937. In 1951 at the age of 48 he opened the batting in a match for Toronto against Marylebone Cricket Club (MCC)  scoring 58.

Loney died at Toronto, Ontario, Canada at the age of 78. He is buried in York Cemetery.

References

External links
Canada's Sports Hall of Fame

1903 births
1982 deaths
Derbyshire cricketers
English cricketers